Guildford Rugby Club is a rugby union team that was formed in 2003 following the merger of the adult sections of Old Guildfordians RFC and Guildford & Godalming RFC. The club is based at Broadwater, which is in Farncombe, Surrey. They are currently competing in Regional 2 South East – the sixth tier of the English rugby union system.

History
Guildford RFC formed in 2003 following a merger between Guildford & Godalming and Old Guildfordians rugby clubs. The team's inaugural season was played in the then, London Division 3SW at Guildford & Godalming RFC's home in Broadwater. This is the second time that the clubs had merged, previously joining of forces in 1946. OGs broke away seven years later to form their own club and Gees – founded as Guildford Rugby Club in 1922 – switched to Broadwater simultaneously, becoming Guildford & Godalming RFC.

In addition to forming a merged men's team, the Guildford Gazelles Ladies team was also formed at this time. The Gazelles recently secured top place in the 2015-16 Women's NC South East West 1 league.

The club's 2nd XV also play at a high level in Division 3 of the Zoo Sports Shield. In 2011 the clubhouse underwent a complete refurbishment including a new bar, function rooms, changing rooms and further plans for a gymnasium and physio rooms.

Honours

Men's 1st XV
Surrey Cup winners (4): 1971, 1972, 1980, 2015
Surrey 1 champions (2): 1987–88, 1992–93
London 2 South West champions (3): 1995–96, 2003–04, 2013–14
London 1 (north v south) promotion play-off winners (2): 2005–06, 2015–16
Surrey Trophy winners (2): 2014, 2015

Ladies 1st XV
 Women's NC South East West 1 champions: 2015–16

Notes

References

External links
Official site

English rugby union teams
Rugby union clubs in Surrey
Sport in Guildford